Gee Bee may refer to:

Granville Brothers Aircraft, an aircraft manufacturer
Gee Bee R-1, a racing plane built by Granville Brothers Aircraft
Gee Bee Sportster, family of sports aircraft built by Granville Brothers Aircraft
Gee Bee Model Y Senior Sportster, a sports aircraft built by Granville Brothers Aircraft
Gee Bee Model Z, a racing plane built by Granville Brothers Aircraft
Gee Bee Department Stores
Gee Bee (video game), a 1978 arcade game by Namco
the nickname of the Finnish boxer Gunnar Bärlund